Kaiji: Against All Rules is Japanese anime television series, based on Tobaku Hakairoku Kaiji, the second part of the manga series Kaiji, written and illustrated by Nobuyuki Fukumoto.

The series was announced by Kodansha's Weekly Young Magazine in 2011. It was broadcast on Nippon TV from April 6 to September 28, 2011. Its 26 episodes were collected into nine DVDs, released by VAP between June 22, 2011, and February 22, 2012. VAP also re-released all the episodes on two DVD box sets on September 21, 2011, and February 22, 2012.

In July 2013, Crunchyroll announced the streaming rights to the series. In November 2020, Sentai Filmworks announced that they have licensed the series for streaming on select digital outlets and home video release. It was released in Japanese with English subtitles on Blu-ray Disc on April 20, 2021.


Episode list

Notes

References

2011 Japanese television seasons
Kaiji (manga)